The Childe (originally titled Sad Tropics) is an upcoming South Korean action-noir film directed by Park Hoon-jung, starring Kim Seon-ho, Kim Kang-woo, Go Ara, and Kang Tae-joo.

Synopsis 
A struggling boxer with a Korean father and a Filipino mother, comes to Korea to find his father who abandoned him. There, he is watched and chased by bad guys.

Cast 
 Kim Seon-ho
 Kim Kang-woo
 Go Ara

Production 
The first script reading was held on December 3, 2021 and filming began on December 10, 2021. Kim Seon-ho departed for Thailand on March 31, 2022, for the shooting of the film.

Originally titled Sad Tropic, on November 30, 2022, the movie distributor Next Entertainment World announced the new title as The Childe and shared that the featured film was planned to be released in 2023.

References

External links
 
 
 

Upcoming films
2020s Korean-language films
South Korean drama films
Films shot in South Korea
Films shot in Thailand